The  was an electric multiple unit (EMU) train type for local services operated by the private railway operator Chichibu Railway in Japan.

History
Four 4-car trains were converted in 1991 from former Tokyu 7000 series commuter EMUs. The trains were not air-conditioned.

Formation
Trainsets were formed as follows.

The 2100 and 2300 cars each had one lozenge-type pantograph.

References

Electric multiple units of Japan
Train-related introductions in 1991
Chichibu Railway
1500 V DC multiple units of Japan